The Ravensthorpe & Districts Football Association is an Australian rules football organisation based in the town of Ravensthorpe on the southern coast of Western Australia, formed in 1968.

It currently has only three clubs; Southerners from Hopetoun, Lakes based in Lake King and Varley, and the Ravensthorpe Tigers.

Clubs

Current

Previous
 Lake King (merged with Lakes Districts to form Lakes)
 Lakes Districts (merged with Lake King to form Lakes)
 Munglinup won four RDFA premierships - 1971, 1988, 1991 and 1993. They also spent time in the Esperance District FA.

References

Australian rules football competitions in Western Australia